Janata Parivar Alliance is an alliance in Indian politics to describe the various political parties that emerged from Janata Dal or others. The Janata Parivar includes, amongst others, Janata Dal (United) and Janata Dal (Secular).

On 14 April 2015, the Janata Dal (United), Janata Dal (Secular), Rashtriya Janata Dal, the Indian National Lok Dal, Samajwadi Party, and Samajwadi Janata Party (Rashtriya) announced that they would merge into a new national Janata Parivar alliance in order to oppose the Bharatiya Janata Party. The Janata Parivar formation took place ahead of the crucial 2015 Bihar Legislative Assembly election.

On 2 September 2015, the Samajwadi Party decided to contest the Bihar elections separately and broke from the alliance. On 26 July 2017, the Janata Dal (United) broke from the Janata Parivar alliance and joined the National Democratic Alliance. The Loktantrik Janata Dal, Rashtriya Janata Dal, Rashtriya Lok Dal and Rashtriya Lok Samta Party are now a part of the United Progressive Alliance. Hindustani Awam Morcha was part of United Progressive Alliance until before 2020 Bihar Legislative Election and later joined National Democratic Alliance. It later joined United Progressive Alliance again.

Currently, the alliance is inactive as the Janata parties have drifted further away from each other ideologically.

Fractions of Janata Dal

References

 
Janata Dal
Political party alliances in India
Political terminology in India
Coalition governments of India
2015 establishments in India
Political parties established in 2015